Tower One & Exchange Plaza is one of the tallest skyscrapers in the Philippines. The building has 35 floors above ground level, and is originally planned to be the first of three towers for the Ayala Triangle. Plans for the construction of the two additional buildings did not materialize though. The area composes of 3 buildings, Ayala Tower One, The Makati Stock Exchange (MkSE) and the former trading floor of the Philippine Stock Exchange, along with 2 buildings under construction.

Tower One & Exchange Plaza was designed by Skidmore, Owings and Merrill, LLP. Leandro V. Locsin & Partners was the local architect of record. The building is owned by Ayala Land, a subsidiary of the Ayala Corporation, which is headquartered in the building (see Ownership). Other institutions headquartered at Ayala Tower One include the primary trading floor of the Philippine Stock Exchange (Until February 2018) and Banco de Oro Universal Bank (BDO). It is the headquarters of the Ayala Corporation, the company that built the Makati Central Business District.

Location
The building is located at the corner of Ayala Avenue and Paseo de Roxas, on one of the three ends of the Ayala Triangle Gardens. Tower One & Exchange Plaza is located near two other famous buildings, the headquarters of Bank of the Philippine Islands, an Ayala Corporation company, and the former main office of Insular Life.

History

This building was built solely as a response to the Philippine Stock Exchange relocating from Makati to the Tektite Towers - West Tower in Ortigas Center. Ayala Land was hoping that the Philippine Stock Exchange would reconsider its plan. It did not completely succeed with its attempt to keep the stock exchange exclusively in Makati since the Philippine Stock Exchange ultimately decided to have two trading floors: one each in Makati and Ortigas Center.

Ownership
The building is strata title having multiple unit owners.

References

External links
Tower One & Exchange Plaza
Ayala Tower One at Emporis

Skyscrapers in Makati
Makati Central Business District
Office buildings in Metro Manila
Skyscraper office buildings in the Philippines
Office buildings completed in 1996
Skidmore, Owings & Merrill buildings
20th-century architecture in the Philippines